The 1950 Cork Senior Hurling Championship was the 62nd staging of the Cork Senior Hurling Championship since its establishment by the Cork County Board in 1887. The draw for the opening round fixtures took place at the Cork Convention on 29 January 1950. The championship began on 23 April 1950 and ended on 17 September 1950.

Glen Rovers were the defending champions.

On 17 September 1950, Glen Rovers won the championship following a 2-8 to 0-5 defeat of St. Finbarr's in the final. This was their 13th championship title overall and their third title in succession.

Team changes

To Championship

Fielded teams after an absence
 Duhallow
 Seandún

Results

First round

 Glen Rovers received a bye in this round.

Second round

 Carbery received a bye in this round.

Semi-finals

Final

References

Cork Senior Hurling Championship
Cork Senior Hurling Championship